Frederik Brandhof (born 5 July 1996) is a Danish professional footballer who plays as a midfielder for Danish Superliga club AGF.

Career

Skive IK
Born in Skive, Brandhof started playing football at Skive IK. He later moved to FK Viborg, where he played for a few seasons, before returning to Skive IK, where he later signed a youth contract in July 2013. And from here, things got trickier.

Brandhof made his debut for Skive in the Danish 2nd Division in the spring of 2014, while he at the age of 17, scored his first goal for the club in a game against Brabrand IF on 28 May 2014. Brandhof was promoted to the first team squad for the 2014-15 season after signing a new two-year deal with the club in June 2014, just as Skive had been promoted to the Danish 1st Division for the 2014-15 season.

Already three months after signing his last contract, Brandhof signed a new contract with Skive in October 2014, this time until June 2017. In his first season in the 1st Division, he played 13 out of 35 games (12 as a substitute, one in the starting lineup). In the following season (2015–16) he became more established player on the team, playing 22 out of 33 matches.

FC Midtjylland
On 11 April 2017, 20-year old Brandhof signed a four-year deal until June 2021 with Danish Superliga club FC Midtjylland. His contract with Midtjylland would run from July 2017, but initially he would be load out to Skive for the rest of 2017. At the same time, however, he would primarily train with FC Midtjylland.

During his six-month loan spell at Skive, Brandhof made 15 appearances and scored two goals. On 28 January 2018, Skive signed a new loan deal with Brandhof, this time for the rest of the season.

After returning to Midtjylland in the summer 2018, Brandhof got his official debut for Midtjylland in a Danish Cup game against Dalum IF on 26 September 2018. This game became his only official appearances for Midtjylland.

Viborg FF
On 19 January 2019, Brandhof joined Danish 1st Division club Viborg FF on deal until June 2021. Brandhof made his debut on 10 March 2019 against Hvidovre IF.

Brandhof scored 10 goals and made five assist in 29 league games as a midfielder in the 2019–20, and was also named player of the year in Viborg for the 2019/20 season.

AGF
On 12 January 2021, it was announced that Brandhof would switch from Viborg FF to Danish Superliga club AGF with effect from the summer of 2021, when the contract with Viborg expired. He signed a contract valid until the end of 2024. Brandhof made his Superliga and AGF debut on 15 August 2021 against F.C. Copenhagen.

Personal life
Frederik Brandhof's uncle, Rasmus Brandhof, has for several years worked as sports director in Skive IK, while his father, just as his father, Claus Brandhof, has sat on the board of the elite department of the same club.

References

External links

Frederik Brandhof at DBU

1996 births
Living people
Danish men's footballers
Association football midfielders
Denmark youth international footballers
Danish Superliga players
Danish 1st Division players
Viborg FF players
Skive IK players
FC Midtjylland players
Aarhus Gymnastikforening players